Wichanee Meechai (born: 5 January 1993) is a Thai professional golfer playing on the U.S.-based LPGA Tour.

Early life 
Meechai was born on 5 January 1993 in Bangkok, Thailand. Her father, Wanchai, is the Senior Tournament Director on the Asian Tour. Meechai started playing golf at the age of 13 years old. She graduated from Ramkhamhaeng University.

Professional career 
Meechai turned professional in 2010. On 25 May 2013, she set the new China LPGA Tour record for low round, with a round of 9-under-par 63, to collect her first international victory at the 2013 Beijing Challenge.

Meechai captured her first career Taiwan LPGA Tour win at the 2015 Yeangder TLPGA Open, outlasted compatriot Mind Muangkhumsakul in the first playoff hole. In December 2015, she finished tied for 22nd at the final stage LPGA Qualifying Tournament to earn LPGA Membership for the 2016 season.

In 2016, Meechai recorded nine top-10 finishes, including three runner-ups, in her first season playing in the United States to finish fourth on the Symetra Tour money list to extend LPGA Membership for the 2017 season.

On 23 May 2021, Meechai recorded her career-best LPGA Tour finish with a tied for fifth place in the Pure Silk Championship in Virginia. Later in June, she recorded her highest ever placing in a major championship with tied for 12th place in the 2021 Women's PGA Championship.

Professional wins (5)

China LPGA Tour wins (1) 
2013 Beijing Challenge

Taiwan LPGA Tour wins (1) 
2015 Yeangder TLPGA Open

Thai LPGA Tour wins (2) 
2013 3rd Singha-SAT Thai LPGA Championship
2020 4th Singha-SAT Thai LPGA Championship

All Thailand Golf Tour wins (1) 
2012 Singha Classic

Results in LPGA majors 
Results not in chronological order.

CUT = missed the half-way cut
NT = no tournament
"T" = tied

References

External links 

 
 

Wichanee Meechai
LPGA Tour golfers
Wichanee Meechai
1993 births
Living people
Wichanee Meechai